Brian Leyden  (born 1960) is an Irish writer from Arigna, County Roscommon and currently living in County Sligo.  He has published the best selling memoir The Home Place, the short story collection Departures, and the novel Death and Plenty. He won the RTÉ Radio 1 Francis MacManus Award in 1988 for The Last Mining Village.  He has written extensively about his home area for RTÉ's Sunday Miscellany and the Documentary on One: No Meadows in Manhattan, Even the Walls Were Sweatin’, The Closing of the Gaiety Cinema in Carrick-on-Shannon and  Practical Rooms and Pre-Fabs.  He co-wrote the original screenplay for the feature film Black Ice, which premiered at the Jameson Dublin International Film Festival 2013.

Early and Working Life

Brian Leyden grew up in the coal mining valley of Arigna, a place and a way of life memorialised in his writing.

He was educated in Drumshanbo Vocational School (1978) and graduated from Sligo RTC with a Diploma in Fine Art (1983).

Since working his way through college with the Sligo VEC & Arts Council of Ireland funded Murals in Schools Scheme, he has worked continuously in the arts, including the positions of Writer in Residence with Leitrim and Sligo Libraries, mentoring for the NUI Galway BA in Creative Writing program, and the Carlow University, Pittsburgh, PA MFA Irish Residential program. Reading tours include Ireland and its Diaspora Writers & Musician’s Tour of Germany (1996), Newport Festival Rhode Island, and The Irish Writers' Centre Peregrine Readings (2010).  His libretto for the short opera Humpty Dumpty by Ian Wilson  premiered at the Lancaster International Concert Series at Lancaster University, England in 2010.

Works

 Departures (1992), short stories.
 Death and Plenty (1996), novel.
 The Home Place (2002) memoir.
 Sweet Old New World: New and Selected Stories (2015), short stories.
 Summer of ’63 (2016), novel.

Awards

 Francis MacManus Short Story Award for The Last Mining Village (1988) 
 Jacobs Award for No Meadows in Manhattan (1991). 
 Arts Council Bursary in Literature (1994). 
 Heinrich Böll Cottage Residency (1998), 
 Arts Council Writer in Residence ‘Leitrim’ (2000). 
 Norman Mailer Writers Colony (at Provincetown, MA) Scholarship (2009) 
 Arts Council Travel & Training Award (2009) 
 Sligo County Libraries Writer-in-Residence (2010) 
 Sidney Brown Memorial Award (2012)  for the musical adaptation Emerald. Music by Denise Wright.  Book and lyrics by Chris Burgess. Based on the novel Death and Plenty by Brian Leyden.
 Broadcasting Authority of Ireland, Sound and Vision Award (2014) 
 The Arts Council/An Chomhairle Ealaíon "Literary Bursary" (2014) 
 Culture Ireland Travel Award, USA, (2017)

References

1960 births
Living people
20th-century Irish novelists
Irish screenwriters
Irish male screenwriters
Irish male short story writers
20th-century Irish short story writers
People from Arigna
People from County Sligo
Irish male novelists
21st-century Irish novelists
21st-century Irish short story writers
20th-century Irish male writers
21st-century Irish male writers
Alumni of the Institute of Technology, Sligo